Jean-Luc Fournier (born 23 September 1956) is a retired Swiss alpine skier who competed in the 1980 Winter Olympics. Although Fournier was unable to achieve another podium finish in the 1980/81 season, he remained in the top ten five times. He finished eighth in the giant slalom at the 1982 World Championships. Fournier ended his career in March 1982 after finishing 11th in Kranjska Gora.

External links
 sports-reference.com

1956 births
Living people
Swiss male alpine skiers
Olympic alpine skiers of Switzerland
Alpine skiers at the 1980 Winter Olympics
Place of birth missing (living people)